Argenteuil is a railway station in Argenteuil, a northwestern suburb of Paris, France.

Connections 
The station is connected to a lot of bus services, mainly originating here.
 RATP 140 272 340 361
 R'Bus 1 2 4 6 7 8 9 18
 Busval d'Oise 30.49 95.19
 Valmy 16
 N52 (night bus)
A connection to the Tangentielle Nord is planned to open around 2027.

See also
 List of stations of the Paris RER
 List of stations of the Paris Métro

References
  Paris et l'Île de France – Tome 1: Les réseaux Est, Nord et Saint-Lazare, 2002, Le Train. ISSN 1267-5008

External links
 

Argenteuil
Railway stations in Val-d'Oise
Railway stations in France opened in 1863